Hermann Leffler (1864–1929) was a German stage and film actor.

Selected filmography
 The Voice (1920)
 Prashna's Secret (1922)
 The Tower of Silence (1924)
 The Fake Emir (1924)
 Horrido (1924)
 A Dangerous Game (1924)
 The Girl from America (1925)
 The Golden Butterfly (1926)

References

Bibliography
 Grange, William. Cultural Chronicle of the Weimar Republic. Scarecrow Press, 2008.

External links

1864 births
1929 deaths
German male film actors
German male stage actors